Eleanor Gudger is a professional poker player from Yarm, England.

Operating under the pseudonym Elz442, Gudger is known for her WPT500 victory at Nottingham’s Dusk till Dawn (DTD) in November 2014, where she earned $222,177. She was signed as a PKR brand ambassador from March 2014 until October 2015, when PKR dissolved the team. As of 2015, Gudger has two World Series of Poker cashes, the larger a final table at the 2013 ladies event, for a little over $27,000.

A tournament specialist, Gudger's combined live and online earnings total over $545,000.

References

Year of birth missing (living people)
Living people
English poker players
Female poker players
Place of birth missing (living people)
People from Yarm
Sportspeople from County Durham